The 183rd Cavalry Regiment is a cavalry regiment of the United States Army, Virginia Army National Guard.  The 183rd Cavalry was established as the 183rd Infantry Regiment and was reflagged as a cavalry regiment in 2006. It provides all armored and cavalry assets for the Virginia National Guard, fielding the M1 Abrams, Bradley Fighting Vehicle, and Humvee.

The primary active component of the 183rd is 2nd Squadron, 2-183, a maneuver element in the 116th Infantry Brigade Combat Team, which in turn is part of the 29th Infantry Division, made up of the Army National Guard forces from Virginia and several other states. The 183rd is headquartered in Virginia Beach and all of its constituent troops are located there or nearby.

Headquarters and Headquarters Troop, 2nd Battalion, 183rd Cavalry is one of several Army National Guard units with campaign credit for the War of 1812.

History

Early years
The 183d Infantry Regiment was activated in 1920 following the end of World War I. As elements of the 116th Infantry Regiment. It arrived at the port of Newport News on 22 May 1919 on the USS Matsonia and was demobilized on 30 May 1919 at Camp Lee, Virginia. It was organized on 30 December 1919 as the 1st Provisional Infantry Regiment, Virginia National Guard, and redesignated the 1st Infantry Regiment, Virginia National Guard, on 7 September 1920. It was redesignated the 183d Infantry Regiment on 9 March 1922 and assigned to the 29th Division. On 22 February 1929, it was again redesignated the 1st Infantry Regiment. It was a part of the 91st Infantry Brigade (later redesignated the 88th Infantry Brigade) in the Virginia National Guard alongside the 116th Infantry Regiment]].

World War II
The regiment participated in training maneuvers with the Virginia Guard until the United States became involved in World War II. On 1 January 1941, it was redesignated the 176th Infantry Regiment. After serving as a separate regiment in the continental United States during the war, it was inactivated in 1944 and provided men to various other units.

Postwar service
After the war, in 1959, the 1st Battalion, 183d Infantry was reactivated as the 1st Squadron, 183d Armor, and served as the 29th Infantry Division's reconnaissance squadron until later inactivation.

War on Terror
The Infantry/Armor unit was reactivated as the 2d Squadron, 183d Cavalry Regiment on 11 February 2006. It was assigned to the 116th Infantry Brigade Combat Team of the 29th Infantry Division. The new squadron was given the mission of providing reconnaissance, surveillance, and target acquisition (or RSTA) for the brigade, and acted as the "eyes and ears" of brigade's commander.  From September 2007 to May 2008, the squadron conducted security operations in Kuwait and Southern Iraq in support of Operation Iraqi Freedom. In August 2011, the 2-183d Cavalry deployed to Iraq again where it conducted convoy security operations under the name of Task Force 183. With 825 members, this was the largest deployment of Virginia National Guard soldiers since World War II. The unit returned home in December 2011.

The 183d Infantry Regiment also became the 183d Regiment during the reorganization, and facilitates the Virginia Army National Guard's RTI (Regional Training Institute) at Fort Pickett, Virginia. Colonel James A. Zollar became commander of the RTI in June 2016.

Current Structure
2nd Squadron, 183rd Cavalry Regiment
 Headquarters and Headquarters Troop; Portsmouth
 A Troop; Virginia Beach, Virginia
 B Troop; Suffolk
 C Troop; Virginia Beach
 D Company, 429th Brigade Support Battalion; Franklin
 Detachment 1; Franklin

183rd Regiment (Regional Training Institute)
 1st Battalion; Fort Pickett
 2nd Battalion; Fort Pickett
 3rd Battalion; Fort Pickett

References

183
Military units and formations in Virginia
Military units and formations established in 2006